Hiram Keith Beebe (March 16, 1921 – July 13, 1998) was an American football back who played one season with the New York Giants of the National Football League. He was drafted by the New York Giants in the 24th round of the 1943 NFL Draft. He played college football at Occidental College and attended Anaheim High School in Anaheim, California.

References

External links
Just Sports Stats

1921 births
1998 deaths
Players of American football from Anaheim, California
American football quarterbacks
American football defensive backs
Occidental Tigers football players
New York Giants players